An electrolithoautotroph is an organism which feeds on electricity. These organisms use electricity to convert carbon dioxide into organic matter by using electrons directly taken from solid-inorganic electron donors. Electrolithoautotrophs are microorganisms which are found in the deep crevices of the ocean. The warm, mineral-rich environment provides a rich source of nutrients. The electron source for carbon assimilation from diffusible Fe2+ ions to an electrode under the condition that electrical current is the only source of energy and electrons. Electrolithoautotrophs form a third metabolic pathway compared to photosynthesis (plants converting light into sugar) and chemosynthesis (bacteria converting chemical energy into food).

References

Biological processes
Electricity
Metabolism
Organisms by adaptation
Trophic ecology